Walter Jackson Freeman II (November 14, 1895 – May 31, 1972) was an American physician who specialized in lobotomy. 

Wanting to simplify lobotomies so that it could be carried out by psychiatrists in psychiatric hospitals, where there were often no operating rooms, surgeons, or anesthesia and limited budgets, Freeman invented a transorbital lobotomy procedure. The ice-pick transorbital approach, a transorbital lobotomy, involved placing an orbitoclast (an instrument resembling an ice pick) under the eyelid and against the top of the eyesocket, a mallet was then used to drive the orbitoclast through the thin layer of bone and into the brain. Freeman's transorbital lobotomy method did not require a neurosurgeon and could be performed outside of an operating room, often by untrained psychiatrists without the use of anesthesia by using electroconvulsive therapy to induce seizure and unconsciousness. In 1947, Freeman's partner Dr. James W. Watts ended their partnership because he was disgusted by Freeman's modification of the lobotomy from a surgical operation into a simple "office" procedure.

Freeman and his procedure played a major role in popularizing lobotomy; he later traveled across the United States visiting mental institutions. In 1951, one of Freeman's patients at Iowa's Cherokee Mental Health Institute died when he suddenly stopped for a photo during the procedure, and the orbitoclast accidentally penetrated too far into the patient's brain. After four decades Freeman had personally performed possibly as many as 4,000 lobotomies on patients as young as 4, despite the fact that he had no formal surgical training. As many as 100 of his patients died of cerebral hemorrhage, and he was finally banned from performing surgery in 1967. Freeman's procedure eventually spread across the world.

Early years
Walter J. Freeman was born on November 14, 1895, and raised in Philadelphia, Pennsylvania, by his parents. Freeman's grandfather, William Williams Keen, was well known as a surgeon in the Civil War. His father was also a very successful doctor. Freeman attended Yale University beginning in 1912, and graduated in 1916. He then moved on to study neurology at the University of Pennsylvania Medical School. While attending medical school, he studied the work of William Spiller and idolized his groundbreaking work in the new field of the neurological sciences. Freeman applied for a coveted position working alongside Spiller in his home town of Philadelphia, but was rejected.

Shortly afterward, in 1924, Freeman relocated to Washington, D.C., and started practicing as the first neurologist in the city. Upon his arrival in Washington, Freeman began work directing laboratories at St. Elizabeths Hospital. Working at the hospital and witnessing the pain and distress suffered by the patients encouraged him to continue his education in the field. Freeman earned his PhD in neuropathology within the following few years and secured a position at George Washington University in Washington, D.C., as head of the neurology department.

In 1932, his mother died at the Philadelphia Orthopedic Hospital in Philadelphia.

Medical practice

The first systematic attempt at human psychosurgery – performed in the 1880s–1890s – is commonly attributed to the Swiss psychiatrist Gottlieb Burckhardt. Burckhardt's experimental surgical forays were largely condemned at the time and in the subsequent decades psychosurgery was attempted only intermittently. On November 12, 1935,  a new psychosurgery procedure was performed in Portugal under the direction of the neurologist and physician Egas Moniz. His new "leucotomy" procedure, intended to treat mental illness, took small corings of the patient's frontal lobes. Moniz became a mentor and idol for Freeman who modified the procedure and renamed it the "lobotomy". Instead of taking corings from the frontal lobes, Freeman's procedure severed the connection between the frontal lobes and the thalamus. Because Walter Freeman was a neurologist and not a neurosurgeon, he enlisted the help of neurosurgeon James Watts. One year after the first leucotomy, on September 14, 1936, Freeman directed Watts through the very first prefrontal lobotomy in the United States on housewife Alice Hood Hammatt of Topeka, Kansas. By November, only two months after performing their first lobotomy surgery, Freeman and Watts had already worked on 20 cases including several follow-up operations. By 1942, the duo had performed over 200 lobotomy procedures and had published results claiming 63% of patients had improved, 23% were reported to be unchanged and 14% were worse after surgery.

Freeman then "developed a transorbital approach" based on the work of an Italian doctor, Amarro Fiamberti, who operated on the brain through his patients' eye sockets, allowing him to access the brain without drilling through the skull. After experimenting with novel ways of performing these brain surgeries, Freeman formulated a new procedure called the transorbital lobotomy. His new procedure allowed him to perform lobotomies without the use of anesthesia, because he used electroconvulsive therapy to induce seizure: "[Freeman] used a mallet to tap an orbitoclast (a slender rod shaped like an icepick) through the orbital roof. Following penetration of the orbital roof, Freeman would sweep the orbitoclast laterally to obliterate frontal lobe tissue. Additionally, he was able to perform the procedure in an office setting because he anesthetized patients with a portable electroshock machine." He performed the transorbital lobotomy surgery for the first time in Washington, D.C., on a housewife named Sallie Ellen Ionesco. In 1950, Walter Freeman's long-time partner James Watts left their practice and split from Freeman due to his opposition to the transorbital lobotomy.

Freeman traveled across the country visiting mental institutions, performing lobotomies and spreading his views and methods to institution staff. (Contrary to myth, there is no evidence that he referred to the van that he traveled in as a "lobotomobile".) Freeman's name gained popularity despite the widespread criticism of his methods following a lobotomy on President John F. Kennedy's sister Rosemary Kennedy, which left her with severe mental and physical disability. A memoir written by former patient Howard Dully, called My Lobotomy, documented his experiences with Freeman and his long recovery after undergoing a lobotomy surgery at 12 years of age. After four decades Freeman had personally performed possibly as many as 4,000 lobotomy surgeries in 23 states, of which 2,500 used his ice-pick procedure, despite the fact that he had no formal surgical training. In February 1967, Freeman performed his final surgery on Helen Mortensen. Mortensen was a long-term patient and was receiving her third lobotomy from Freeman. She died of a cerebral hemorrhage, as did as many as 100 of his other patients, and he was finally banned from performing surgery. His patients often had to be retaught how to eat and use the bathroom. Relapses were common, some never recovered, and about 15% died from the procedure. In 1951, one patient at Iowa's Cherokee Mental Health Institute died when Freeman suddenly stopped for a photo during the procedure, and the surgical instrument accidentally penetrated too far into the patient's brain. Freeman wore neither gloves nor mask during these procedures. He lobotomized 19 minors, including a four-year-old child. 

At 57 years old, Freeman retired from his position at George Washington University and opened up a modest practice in California.

An extensive collection of Freeman's papers were donated to The George Washington University in 1980.  The collection largely deals with the work that Freeman and James W. Watts did on psychosurgery over the course of their medical careers.  The collection is currently under the care of GWU's Special Collections Research Center, located in the Estelle and Melvin Gelman Library.

Freeman was known for his eccentricities and he complemented his theatrical approach to demonstrating surgery by sporting a cane, goatee, and a narrow-brimmed hat.

Death
Freeman died of complications arising from an operation for cancer on May 31, 1972.

He was survived by four children—Walter, Frank, Paul and Lorne—who became defenders of their father's legacy. Paul became a psychiatrist in San Francisco, and the eldest, Walter Jr., became a professor of neurobiology at University of California, Berkeley.

Contributions to psychiatry
Walter Freeman nominated his mentor António Egas Moniz for a Nobel prize, and in 1949 Moniz won the Nobel prize in physiology and medicine. He pioneered and helped open up the psychiatric world to the idea of what would become psychosurgery. At the time, it was seen as a possible treatment for severe mental illness, but "within a few years, lobotomy was labeled one of the most barbaric mistakes of modern medicine." He also helped to demonstrate the idea that mental events have a physiological basis. Despite his interest in the mind, Freeman was "uninterested in animal experiments or understanding what was happening in the brain". Freeman was also co-founder and president of the American Board of Psychiatry and Neurology from 1946 to 1947  and a contributor and member of the American Psychiatric Association.

Works
 Freeman, W. and Watts, J.W. Psychosurgery. Intelligence, Emotion and Social Behavior Following Prefrontal Lobotomy for Mental Disorders, Charles C. Thomas Publisher, Springfield (Ill.) 1942, pp. 337.

References

Further reading

External links

Guide to the Walter Freeman and James Watts papers, 1918–1988, Special Collections Research Center, Estelle and Melvin Gelman Library, The George Washington University
The Lobotomist, authoritative biography of Freeman by Jack El-Hai
New England Journal of Medicine article
Article referencing Jack El-Hai's initial Washington Post feature on Freeman
A Brief History of Lobotomy
'My Lobotomy' documentary program from SoundPortraits.org
"Shedding Light on Shadowland"

American neurologists
1895 births
1972 deaths
Physicians from Philadelphia
Perelman School of Medicine at the University of Pennsylvania alumni
Yale University alumni
American psychiatrists
Lobotomy
Human subject research in psychiatry